The 2015 Pan and Parapan American Games venues were mostly located in the host city of Toronto, Ontario, though some events required facilities located elsewhere.  Besides Toronto, fourteen other municipalities in Southern Ontario hosted competitions: Ajax, Hamilton, Innisfil, Markham, Milton, Minden, Mississauga, Mono, Oro-Medonte, Oshawa, Palgrave, St. Catharines, Welland and Whitby.

Naming

The Pan American Sports Organization (PASO) and the Toronto 2015 Organizing Committee have a number of major sponsors for the Pan American Games, who are entitled to have their name exclusively associated with the event. As a consequence, any other company that provides sponsorship is not permitted to use its name or branding during the games, which includes venue naming rights (including those not provided by corporate sponsorship and those named in honor of people).

As a consequence of this, eight Pan American venues are temporarily renamed for the duration of the Games:
BMO Field – Exhibition Stadium 
General Motors Centre – Oshawa Sports Centre
Hershey Centre – Mississauga Sports Centre
Ricoh Coliseum – Toronto Coliseum
Direct Energy Centre - Exhibition Centre
Rexall Centre – Canadian Tennis Centre
Rogers Centre – Pan Am Ceremonies Venue
Tim Hortons Field - CIBC Hamilton Pan Am Soccer Stadium

Sporting venues

In total, 28 venues were used during the 2015 Pan American Games.

The 2015 Games used a mixture of newly built venues, existing facilities, and temporary facilities, some of them in well-known locations such as Exhibition Place and Centennial Park. Some of the new facilities were to be reused in their Pan American Games form (for example the BMX track), while others were reduced in size (for example the Toronto Pan Am Sports Centre).

All venue capacities listed below are found in the strategic framework for transportation published by the Government of Ontario.

CIBC Pan Am Park

The Toronto Pan Am Park encompasses all of the facilities within Exhibition Place in downtown Toronto. The Pan Am Park included the name of the lead partner in sponsorship, CIBC. This Zone consists of six venues. Exhibition Centre had three different halls hosting events, while the Ontario Place West Channel had two grandstands (one each for water and road based sports). Furthermore, the marathon, race walks and road races in cycling had their start and finish lines at the  West Channel. The remainder of the race occurred all the way into High Park and back. The park contains:

Rest of Toronto

 A main grandstand court of 6,500 (was used for medal sessions only), plus seven other courts ranging in capacity from 200 to 1,625.
 Only seating room available.

Haliburton

Hamilton and Niagara

Peel Region, Halton and Simcoe

York Region and Durham

Atos Markham Pan Am / Parapan Am Centre had a field house which seated 2,000 during the Pan American Games and 1,000 during the Parapan American Games. The facility also had a pool with a capacity of 2,000
Pan Am Ball Park had two fields for baseball and one for softball. Each had additional standing room capacity.

Original Plan
The venue plan has been vastly changed from the original plan, with sixty percent of the 51 original venues being dropped. The venues were to be divided into three zones - Central Games Zone (Toronto, Mississauga, Brampton, Richmond Hill and Markham), West Games Zone (Hamilton) and East Games Zone (Oshawa, Ajax and Pickering). In addition there were also be venues located outside these zones in Barrie, St. Catharines, Palgrave, Minden and Welland. Ian Troop the CEO of the Organizing Committee said the venue plan was changed because, "the benefits of clustering are that you create economies of scale, the goal for our refined and improved venue plan is to reduce the operational complexities of the event, save costs, deliver an athlete-centred Games that facilitates great performance and create a much richer spectator experience.” Among the changes included the city's largest arena the Air Canada Centre being dropped, due to the organizing committee feeling none of the events warranted that amount of seating (20,000) and the desire to have full venues. Also the cities of Richmond Hill, Burlington and Brampton among others were dropped as host cities. Organizers later revealed a plan that put the majority of venues have into nine cluster zones within the Greater Toronto Area: the Toronto Pan Am Park, Abilities Centre cluster, Etobicoke, Markham, Mississauga, Scarborough, University of Toronto (downtown) and York University clusters. In addition to these there was fourteen venues that was to be outside the boundaries of the Greater Toronto Area. This plan was later replaced with the current venue proposal of five venue zones.

References

External links
Toronto 2015 Venue information

2015 Pan American Games
2015 Parapan American Games
Venues of the Pan American Games
Venues of the 2015 Pan American Games
Venues of the 2015 Parapan American Games
Sports venues in Toronto